Addiction medicine is a medical subspecialty that deals with the diagnosis, prevention, evaluation, treatment, and recovery of persons with addiction, of those with substance-related and addictive disorders, and of people who show unhealthy use of substances including alcohol, nicotine, prescription medicine and other illicit and licit drugs. The medical subspecialty often crosses over into other areas, since various aspects of addiction fall within the fields of public health, psychology, social work, mental health counseling, psychiatry, and internal medicine, among others. Incorporated within the specialty are the processes of detoxification, rehabilitation, harm reduction, abstinence-based treatment, individual and group therapies, oversight of halfway houses, treatment of withdrawal-related symptoms, acute intervention, and long term therapies designed to reduce likelihood of relapse. Some specialists, primarily those who also have expertise in family medicine or internal medicine, also provide treatment for disease states commonly associated with substance use, such as hepatitis and HIV infection.

Physicians specializing in the field are in general agreement concerning applicability of treatment to those with addiction to drugs, such as alcohol and heroin, and often also to gambling, which has similar characteristics and has been well-described in the scientific literature. There is less agreement concerning definition or treatment of other so-called addictive behavior such as sexual addiction and internet addiction, such behaviors not being marked generally by physiologic tolerance or withdrawal.

Doctors focusing on addiction medicine are medical specialists who focus on addictive disease and have had special study and training focusing on the prevention and treatment of such diseases. There are two routes to specialization in the addiction field: one via a psychiatric pathway and one via other fields of medicine. The American Society of Addiction Medicine notes that approximately 40% of its members are psychiatrists (MD/DO) while the remainder have received primary medical training in other fields.

Accreditation in the United States
In March 2016, the American Board of Medical Specialties (ABMS) announced recognition of the field of addiction medicine as a new medical subspecialty. In several countries around the world, specialist bodies have been set up to ensure high quality practice in addiction medicine. For example, within the United States, there are two accepted specialty examinations. One is a Board Certification in Addiction Psychiatry from the American Board of Psychiatry and Neurology. The other is a Board Certification in Addiction Medicine from the American Board of Preventive Medicine. The latter approach is available to all physicians with primary Board certification, while the former is available only to board-certified psychiatrists.

Doctors of Osteopathic Medicine may also seek board certification via the American Osteopathic Association (AOA). The Doctor of Osteopathic Medicine must have a primary board certification in Neurology & Psychiatry, Internal Medicine, or Family Practice from the American Osteopathic Association and complete an AOA approved addiction medicine fellowship. Successful completion of a board examination administered via the AOA will grant a certificate of added qualification (CAQ) in addiction medicine.

Accreditation internationally 
Within Australia, addiction medicine specialists are certified via the Chapter of Addiction Medicine, which is part of the Royal Australasian College of Physicians. They may alternatively be a member of the Section of Addiction Psychiatry, Royal Australian & New Zealand College of Psychiatrists.

The International Society of Addiction Medicine also can provide certification of expertise.

Medical societies 
 American Society of Addiction Medicine (ASAM)

Medical journals 
 Journal of Addiction Medicine (JAM)
 Journal of Addictions Nursing
 JAMA Neurology

See also
Addiction psychiatry
American Society of Addiction Medicine
Narcology

References

Further reading
Latt, Noeline; Katherine Conigrave, Jane Marshall, John Saunders, E. Jane Marshall, David Nutt (2009) Addiction medicine. Oxford: Oxford University Press.
Psychedelic Medicine: New Evidence for Hallucinogens as Treatments Vol. 2. Michael J. Winkelman and Thomas B. Roberts (editors) (2007). Westport, CT: Praeger/Greenwood. Chapter 1, Halpern, John H. "Hallucinogens in the Treatment of Alcoholism and Other Addictions," Chapter 2, Yensen, Richard, and Dryer, Donna, "Addiction, Despair, and the Soul: Successful Psychedelic Psychotherapy: A Case Study," Chapter 4. Alper, R. Kenneth, and Lotsof, Howard S. "The Use of Ibogaine in the Treatment of Addictions," Chapter 6. Mabit, Jacques. "Ayahuasca in the Treatment of Addictions".
 Hughes LD (2012). "How should healthcare students view addiction and substance abuse?" Scottish Universities Medical Journal. EPub 001.
"Addiction Series" (three parts). The Lancet (2012).

External links
ISAM — International Society of Addiction Medicine
ABPN — American Board of Psychiatry and Neurology
ABAM — American Board of Addiction Medicine
ASAM — American Society of Addiction Medicine
AOAAM — American Osteopathic Academy of Addiction Medicine

 
Substance-related disorders